Daniela Yael Krukower (born 6 January 1975 in Colegiales, Buenos Aires) is a former judoka from Argentina.

Biography
Krukower was born in Buenos Aires, Argentina to a Jewish family, and at an early age moved with her family to Israel where Daniela was introduced to Judo.
In the mid 90' Israel judo had two promising female judoka, Einat Yaron and Daniela, both competing in the -63 category. The two girls were more rivals than they were friends. Daniela thought Yaron was favoured by the Israel Judo Association and since the IFJ limits each country to one participant in each category at the Olympic Games she decided to represent her birth country Argentina.

She retired at beginning of 2009/10 season due to lack of motivation after winning gold at 2009 Pan American Judo Championships.

Judo
In 1997, Krukower won a silver medal in judo at U66 at the 1997 Maccabiah Games in Tel Aviv, Israel.

The highlight of Daniela's career came at the World Judo Championships in Osaka. In the final she beat, by ippon, Cuban Olympic gold medalist Driulys González. She was not considered a favourite before the championships, but was a known competitor. After her win, Daniela became a celebrity in Argentina and a medal hope for the Olympic Games the following year.

Unlike at the World Championships in Osaka, at the 2004 Olympic Games in Athens Krukower came as big favourite. She won her first two fights by golden score and in the semi-final she faced Ayumi Tanimoto from Japan. Early in the fight, following a technique by the Japanese judoka, Daniela broke her hand. The extent of the injury was serious and Krukower could not continue in tournament. Driulys González her next potential opponent won the bronze medal without a fight. In result of the injury the Argentine media call Daniela "Iron Lady".

Krukower went on to compete but managed only continental successes.

In the judo competition at the 2005 Maccabiah Games, she won a silver medal when 17-year-old Alice Schlesinger defeated her in the final.

Achievements

See also
List of select Jewish judokas

References

External links
 
 
 
 
 

1975 births
Living people
Argentine Jews
Argentine emigrants to Israel
Argentine female judoka
Jewish Argentine sportspeople
Jewish Israeli sportspeople
Jewish sportspeople
Jewish martial artists
Judoka at the 2003 Pan American Games
Judoka at the 2007 Pan American Games
Judoka at the 2000 Summer Olympics
Judoka at the 2004 Summer Olympics
Pan American Games bronze medalists for Argentina
Olympic judoka of Argentina
Sportspeople from Buenos Aires
Maccabiah Games medalists in judo
Maccabiah Games silver medalists for Argentina
International Jewish Sports Hall of Fame inductees
Competitors at the 2005 Maccabiah Games
Pan American Games medalists in judo
South American Games gold medalists for Argentina
South American Games silver medalists for Argentina
South American Games medalists in judo
Competitors at the 2002 South American Games
Competitors at the 2006 South American Games
Medalists at the 2003 Pan American Games
Medalists at the 2007 Pan American Games